Limnaecia eristica is a moth of the family Cosmopterigidae. It is known from Australia.

References

Limnaecia
Moths described in 1919
Taxa named by Edward Meyrick
Moths of Australia